Qaderabad (also Romanized as Qāderābād) is a village in Ladiz Rural District, in the Central District of Mirjaveh County, Sistan and Baluchestan Province, Iran. At the 2006 census, its population was 46, in 9 families.

References 

Populated places in Mirjaveh County